Krzeczowice  (Krechovychi) is a village in the administrative district of Gmina Kańczuga, within Przeworsk County, Subcarpathian Voivodeship, in south-eastern Poland.

See also
 Walddeutsche

References

Krzeczowice